The Trondheim Fjord or Trondheimsfjorden, an inlet of the Norwegian Sea, is Norway's third-longest fjord at  long. It is located in the west-central part of the country in Trøndelag county, and it stretches from the municipality of Ørland in the west to the municipality of Steinkjer in the north, passing the city of Trondheim on its way.

The largest islands in the fjord are Ytterøya and Tautra; the small island of Munkholmen is located near the harbor of Trondheim; and there are several islands at the entrance of the fjord. The narrow Skarnsundet is crossed by the Skarnsund Bridge. The part of the fjord to the north of the strait is referred to as the Beitstadfjorden. The main part of the Trondheimsfjord is ice-free all year; only Verrasundet, a long and narrow fjord branch in the northern part of the fjord, might be ice covered in winter. The Beitstadfjorden might also freeze over in winter, but only for a few weeks.

The towns of Stjørdalshalsen, Levanger, and Steinkjer are found on the eastern and northeastern shores of the fjord. Aker Verdal in Verdal produces large offshore installations for the petroleum sector. A yard in Indre Fosen completed the luxurious apartment ship MS The World. Fiborgtangen is a peninsula along the eastern shore of the fjord where a large paper mill owned by Norske Skog is located.

The Trondheimsfjord has rich marine life, with both southern and northern species; at least 90 species of fish have been observed, and the fjord has the largest biological production among Norway's fjords. In recent years, deep water corals (Lophelia pertusa) were discovered in the fjord, not far from the city of Trondheim. Several of the best salmon rivers in Norway empty into the fjord. Among these are the rivers Gaula (in Orkland just south of Trondheim), Orklaelva (also in Orkland), Stjørdalselva (in Stjørdal), and Verdalselva (in Verdal).

The lowland east and south of the fjord represents one of Norway's best agricultural areas. The more rugged and mountainous Fosen peninsula lies to the west and northwest, giving some shelter from the wind common to coastal areas.

The Trondheimsfjord was an important waterway in the Viking Age, as it is still today. In 1888, an undersea mudslide caused a tsunami that killed one person in Trondheim and ruptured three railway lines.

Four giant squid have been found in the fjord, which is among the highest concentrations in the world.

Name
The fjord is named after the city of Trondheim, but originally the name of the fjord might have been just *Þrónd or *Þróund in Old Norse. A name like that would be related to the verb þróast, which means to 'thrive' or 'flourish' and the name Þrór, which means 'likeable' or 'stoutish' (and was one of Odin's nicknames).

If this is the case, then the people living around the fjord (the þrœndir; see Trøndelag) named themselves after the fjord. (Compare sygnir, which means 'the people living around the fjord Sogn'.)

Media gallery

See also
Ellen Lie
Petter Lie

References

External links

 Norwegian Journal of Geology:The deglaciation of Trondheimsfjord
 NTNU Trondhjem biological station
 Pictures and information about cold coral reefs
 Coral reefs in Trondheimsfjord and Norway
 The sea trees of Trondheim
 The rich bird life of the inner Trondheimsfjord wetland system

 
Fjords of Trøndelag
Geography of Trondheim
Indre Fosen
Ørland
Orkland
Skaun
Malvik
Stjørdal
Frosta
Levanger
Verdal
Steinkjer